Kirkino is a rural locality (a village) in Kichmegnskoye Rural Settlement, Kichmengsko-Gorodetsky District, Vologda Oblast, Russia. The population was 61 as of 2002.

Geography 
Kirkino is located 12 km northwest of Kichmengsky Gorodok (the district's administrative centre) by road. Vaganovo is the nearest rural locality.

References 

Rural localities in Kichmengsko-Gorodetsky District